Emmonsiosis, also known as emergomycosis, is a systemic fungal infection that can affect the lungs, generally always affects the skin and can become widespread. The lesions in the skin look like small red bumps and patches with a dip, ulcer and dead tissue in the centre.

It is caused by the Emergomyces species, a novel dimorphic fungus, previously classified under the genus Emmonsia. These fungi are found in soil and transmitted by breathing in its spores from the air. Inside the body it converts to yeast-like cells which then cause disease and invade beyond the lungs. Diagnosis is by skin biopsy and its appearance under the microscope. It is difficult to distinguish from histoplasmosis.

Treatment is usually with amphotericin B.

Emmonsiosis can be fatal. The disseminated type is more prevalent in South Africa, particularly in people with HIV.

Signs and symptoms
Generally, all cases have involvement of the skin. The lesions look like small red bumps and patches with a dip, ulcer and dead tissue in the centre. There may be several lesions and their distribution can be widespread. The lungs may be affected.

Cause
It is caused by the Emergomyces species, a novel dimorphic fungus, previously classified under the genus Emmonsia. Following a revised taxonomy in 2017 based on DNA sequence analyses, five of these Emmonsia-like fungi have been placed under the separate genus Emergomyces. These include Emergomyces pasteurianus, Emergomyces africanus, Emergomyces canadensis, Emergomyces orientalis and Emergomyces europaeus.

Emergomyces africanus was previously known as Emmonsia africanus, which has similar features to Histoplasma spp. and the family of Ajellomycetaceae.

The disease has been observed among people who have a weakened immune system and risk factors include HIV, organ transplant and steroid use.

Mechanism
The fungus is found in soil and is released in the air. Transmission is by breathing in fungal spores from the air. Inside the body it converts to yeast-like cells which then cause disease and invade beyond the lungs. In people with HIV, Emmonsiosis has been associated with Immune reconstitution inflammatory syndrome following initiating antiretroviral treatment.

Diagnosis
Diagnosis is by skin biopsy and its appearance under the microscope.

Differential diagnosis
Generally, it is difficult to distinguish from histoplasmosis. Other conditions that appear similar include tuberculosis, blastomycosis, sporotrichosis, chicken pox, Kaposi's sarcoma and drug reactions.

Treatment
Treatment usually includes amphotericin B.

Prognosis
It can be fatal.

Epidemiology
The disseminated type is more prevalent in South Africa, particularly in people with HIV.

History
The disease was thought to be a rare condition of the lung. Early cases may have been misdiagnosed as histoplasmosis.

Other animals
The genus Emmonsia can cause adiaspiromycosis, a lung disease in wild animals.

References

Mycosis-related cutaneous conditions
Rare diseases
Rare infectious diseases
Fungal diseases